Magic Windows is the thirty-second album by jazz pianist Herbie Hancock, released on September 29, 1981 on Columbia. This album continues his collaboration with associate producer Jeffrey Cohen, who co-wrote four of the tracks on the album. Additionally, the track "Satisfied with Love" was co-written by his sister, Jean Hancock. Musicians involved in this album include guitarists Wah-Wah Watson, Ray Parker Jr. and Adrian Belew, vocalist Sylvester and percussionists Sheila E. and Paulinho da Costa.

Track listing
"Magic Number" (David Rubinson, Hancock, Jeffrey Cohen) – 7:24
"Tonight's the Night" (Hancock, Jeffrey Cohen, Ray Parker Jr.) – 6:31
"Everybody's Broke" (Alphonse Mouzon, Gavin Christopher, Hancock, Jeffrey Cohen) – 7:11
"Help Yourself" (David Rubinson, Gavin Christopher, Hancock, Jeffrey Cohen) – 6:43
"Satisfied with Love" (Hancock, Jean Hancock) – 6:31
"The Twilight Clone" (Adrian Belew, Hancock) – 8:19
"Magic Number" (Disco Version) (David Rubinson, Hancock, Jeffrey Cohen) - 9:30

Synthesisers
Amongst the other synthesizers employed on this album, an  Alpha Syntauri (enhanced Apple computer) was used for some of the tracks.

Liner-notes on the CD version, from "Jazz Originals Series", say "There are no strings, or other orchestral instruments on this album. All of these orchestrations are performed by Herbie Hancock on various synthesizers."

Personnel
Herbie Hancock - E-mu Polyphonic keyboard, E-mu Emulator, clavitar, Minimoog, Prophet 5, Oberheim 8 Voice, Yamaha CS-80, ARP Odyssey, ARP 2600, Hohner clavinet, Rhodes 88 Suitcase piano, Sennheiser, Linn LM-1 drum computer, modified Apple II plus microcomputer, acoustic piano, bass (2), backing vocals (3)
Michael Brecker - tenor saxophone (2, 4)
Ray Parker Jr. (1-2), George Johnson (3, 6), Al McKay (4), Wah-Wah Watson (5), Adrian Belew (6) - guitar
Freddie Washington (1, 5), Louis Johnson (3, 6), Ed Watkins (4) - bass
John Robinson (1, 3), Ray Parker Jr. (2), James Gadson (4), Alphonse Mouzon (5) - drums
Kwasi Dzidzornu, Kwawu Ladzekpo, Moody Perry III - bells, Ghanaian drums (6)
Juan Escovedo, Pete Escovedo, Sheila Escovedo (1), Paulinho da Costa (6) - percussion
Sylvester (1), Vicki Randle (2), Gavin Christopher (3-5) - lead vocals
Jeanie Tracy (1), Dede Dickerson, Ngoh Spencer and Vicki Randle (2-4), David Bottom and Jeffrey Cohen (3), Julia, Luther, Maxine and Oren Waters (5) - backing vocals

See also 
 
 Page describing software for the Alpha Syntauri system

References 

1981 albums
Columbia Records albums
Herbie Hancock albums
Albums produced by Dave Rubinson